Emapalumab, sold under the brand name Gamifant, is an anti-interferon-gamma (IFNγ) antibody medication used for the treatment of hemophagocytic lymphohistiocytosis (HLH), which has no cure.

The most common side effects include infections, hypertension, infusion-related reactions, and pyrexia.

The U.S. Food and Drug Administration (FDA) considers it to be a first-in-class medication.

Medical uses 
Emapalumab is used to treat primary hemophagocytic lymphohistiocytosis (HLH) with refractory, recurrent or progressive disease or intolerance with conventional HLH therapy.

Adverse effects
In the clinical trials that lead to emapalumab's FDA approval, the most commonly reported adverse effects were infections (56%), high blood pressure (41%), infusion reactions (27%), and fever (24%). Serious adverse effects occurred in about half of the subjects studied in the clinical trial that led to its FDA approval.

Pharmacology

Mechanism of action
In the setting of HLH, over-secretion of IFN-γ is thought to contribute to the pathogenesis of the disease. Emapalumab binds and neutralizes IFN-γ, preventing it from inducing pathological effects.

Pharmacokinetics
Like other antibody-based medications, which are made of amino acid chains called polypeptides, emapalumab is broken down into smaller peptides via the body's normal catabolism.

Society and culture

Legal status 
The U.S. Food and Drug Administration (FDA) granted orphan drug designations in 2010 and 2020, and breakthrough therapy designation in 2016, on the basis of preliminary data from the phase II trial.

In July 2020, and again in November 2020, the European Medicines Agency (EMA) recommended the refusal of the marketing authorization for emapalumab.

Research
The research name of emapalumab was NI-0501. A phase II/III trial began in 2013 and is ongoing . The trial targets patients under the age of 18 who have failed to improve on conventional treatments. This study was realised in the context of an EU-funded FP7 project, named FIGHT-HLH (306124).

References

External links
 
 

Breakthrough therapy
Experimental drugs
Monoclonal antibodies
Orphan drugs